FIVE FOXes Co.,Ltd. (ファイブフォックス) is a company known as the apparel maker for COMME ÇA DU MODE.

It was famous for not having its own homepage, but it was created in August 2007 to accept new employees.

History

1976 - company established, COMME ÇA DU MODE was also created.
1978 - First store was created in Sapporo, Hokkaido
1993 - COMME ÇA ISM created
2000 - COMME ÇA Store created

Main Brands
COMME ÇA DU MODE
COMME ÇA ISM
CCM
COMME ÇA COLLECTION
ARTISAN
PRIGS
PPFM
Three Minutes Happiness

References
Company Information

External links
Official Site 
Cafe comme ca 

Manufacturing companies based in Tokyo
Clothing manufacturers